Bhargava is a surname. Notable persons with that name include:

 Alok Bhargava, Indian econometrician
 Girdhari Lal Bhargava (1936 – 2009), Indian politician, and member of the Lok Sabha
 Gopi Chand Bhargava (1889 – 1966), first Chief Minister of Punjab
 H. R. Bhargava, Indian film director
 Kant Kishore Bhargava, Indian diplomat
 Lila Ramkumar Bhargava, Indian freedom fighter, social worker
 Manish Bhargav, (born 1994), Indian footballer
 Manjul Bhargava, Canadian-American mathematician of Indian origin
 Manoj Bhargava, Indian American businessman and philanthropist
 Pranava Bhargava, Entrepreneur, 
 Pushpa Mittra Bhargava, Indian scientist, writer, and administrator
 Rajeev Bhargava (born 1954), Indian political theorist
 Ranjit Bhargava, Indian environmentalist
 Ravindranath Bhargava, Indian politician from Madhya Pradesh.
 R. C. Bhargava (born 1934), chairman of Maruti Suzuki
 Seema Bhargava, Indian film and television actress
 Sharda Bhargava (1912–1999), Indian politician, of Indian National Congress and member Rajya Sabha
 Sneh Bhargava, Indian radiologist, medical academic
 Vikrant Bhargava, entrepreneur
 Sandeep Bhargava, Founder Director OneCert International www.onecertinternational.com

See also 
Bhargava

Bhagwati devi Bhargava